East Kilbride YM Football Club (also known as The YM) are the oldest and most successful club based in East Kilbride, South Lanarkshire. The club currently have four adult teams competing in the Caledonian, Scottish Amateur Football League, Greater Glasgow Leagues and Central Scottish Over 35s as well as under-17s and under-19s. 'The YM' is part of the EK United Community Club alongside East Kilbride YC and East Kilbride Girls. The club also host the most popular Player of the Year and Speakers night in the East Kilbride area and an annual Invitational Tournament.

History

Formation and early years 
East Kilbride YM were formed in 1921 with one of the earliest Team Managers being John Cadzow. The club was kept going through the war by enlisting local players and serviceman stationed nearby. In 1947 Angus McConnell became involved as Secretary and Organiser at only 16-years old. Despite never playing for ‘the YM’, McConnell was an ever present figure within the club and, as well as his secretarial duties, was at the forefront of the club's fundraising endeavours raising money for local and national charities. At the Annual EKYM Speakers Dinner, McConnell was named Honorary President.

Despite there being no official league, East Kilbride YM kept playing throughout the war and then into the 1950s when they were accepted into the Scottish Amateur Football League. John Cadzow is widely credited with the establishment of East Kilbride YM as a club and sustaining it through its difficult early stages.

In the early-1950s, Jack Fowler became manager and won numerous trophies over his decade in charge. It was at this time 17-year-old Les Goodfellow and Eric Gunning joined The YM. Both played their way through the ranks to the first team where they stayed for many years. After retiring, the pair became actively involved in the running of the club until 2012, almost 60 years later.

The early-1960s saw the club add under-16 and under-18 squads bringing with them a steady stream of talented youth players. In 1961 the men's team reached the final of the Coronation Cup against Clyde Paper. A game in which Alistair McCartney suffered a broken leg and the team forced to continue with 10 men. Against the odds, the YM went on to win 3–2 and lift the Coronation Cup.

In 1980 Bobby Jarvie managed the East Kilbride YM under-18s to the final of the Scottish Amateur Youth Cup. They were ultimately beaten 2–1 with two late goals from Andy Walker, who would go on to play for Newcastle United and Bolton Wanderers, and his brother.

Recent Years

Caledonian League Team 
The Caledonian League Team won promotion to the First Division (later renamed the Premier Division) in the 1995–96 season where they stayed until 2005, when after a poor season, were relegated down into the new First Division (formerly the Second Division). John McCole returned to manage the team after the relegation and came close to promotion on two occasions but narrowly missed out. McCole retired from management in 2011, a year after winning the East Kilbride YM Annual Tournament. Graeme Robertson and assistant Billy Hamilton, were put in charge of the Caley Team following their double winning season with the SAFL team. Since Robertson's appointment the ageing team were slowly replaced with younger players from EKYC and other youth teams in the town which resulted in steady improvement year upon year in the league and Cup Competitions. The team reached the latter stages of the West of Scotland cup in the 2012–13 season but were knocked out convincingly by the eventual winners, Hurlford Thistle.

On 3 June 2015, The Caledonian Team reached the Final of the Caledonian AFA Presidents Cup Final, beating Hamilton FP 1–0 with Connor McCann scoring the winning goal. This was the first trophy the Caledonian Team had won in 17 years.

In August 2015,  Scott Chaplain was announced as the team's new player/coach after retiring from Senior football due to his new job within the SFA.

During Season 2015-2016 the team were knocked out of the Scottish Cup on penalties by the eventual finalists Leven in the last 16 of the Competition.

The team continued to flourish and narrowly missed out on promotion in Season 2016-2017 by 2 points and reaching a Semi Final and Quarter Final in League Cups.

Scottish Amateur Team 
In 1996, East Kilbride YM were accepted into the Caledonian League, after winning the Scottish Amateur Premier League Cup under the charges of John McClymont and Peter Allan. The YM elected to enter a new team into the SAFL and were made to start again at the bottom of the league system. The Scottish Amateur team became a feeder for the Caley team and competed in the Scottish Amateur 2nd Division until 2003 when they won the league.

Having been relegated in previous seasons, the Scottish Amateur team found themselves back in the Second Division at the start of 2010–11. The appointment of Graeme Robertson and Billy Hamilton saw the most successful season for the team since their inclusion in the SAFL for a second time. The team went unbeaten in the league until 2011 and progressed to the Hall Cup Final to face Aitkenhead Thistle AFC in April 2011. Within the space of two weeks, the SAFL team had secured both the league and Hall Cup marking a tremendous end to their season.

After Robertsons move to the Caley side, Gary Lawson took over as manager before work commitments forced him to hand over the reins to Andy Dykes, previously a coach with the Caley side, for the 2013–14 Season.

Tam Barclay and Stephen McKenna took over in June 2014 with enthusiasm as the second wave of YM under-19's progress to the adult side.

Greater Glasgow Team 
The Greater Glasgow PL side was created for the 2012–13 season, reflecting the growing popularity and interest in the YM. Marshalled by Colin Dailly in its inaugural season, it was a difficult season with a poor showing in the league.

With the first wave of under-19's moving to the adult side since the inception of the EKYMC Community Club, Gordon McCulloch followed his players into the management position.

The team got off to a flying start in the league and began to show themselves as real contenders for the league title despite their youth. The squad looked unstoppable in the Greater Glasgow Premier League Cup as they saw off tough opposition on their way to the final where they met Broomhouse. In the final, the YM lost 4–3 against a very good Broomhouse side who had dominated their league in the 2013–14 season. In season 2016-17 Graeme Ronbertson JNR (former league and cup winner with the SAFL team) took charge from Gordon McCulloch. An 8th place finish in Division 2 secured their position in the league for the following season. In his second season as manager he took the team to the League Cup Final against Cambria in which two late goals saw them lose 3-2 on the night. A strong third place finish was to follow in the league, gaining promotion to the top Division for the first time in the club's history. Season 2018/19 brought a tough challenge in the top division in which they finished a respectable sixth in the table. Robertson took his team to the semi final of all three cup competitions narrowly missing out on each occasion.

Annual Tournament 

The 'YM Invitational Cup' is a pre season invitational company hosted by East Kilbride YM. The four-week competition was inaugurated in 2010 and has been held every summer since. Since 2010 the tournament has grown in popularity and 16 teams have competed in the adults competition since 2013. In 2013 an under-19's tournament was introduced to run alongside the adults cup with eight teams participating.

The competition follows a Champions League style set up with initial group stages and progressing to a knockout stage.

East Kilbride YM won their inaugural tournament in 2010, Rolls Royce in 2012, and Broomhouse won the 2013 and 2014 editions.

Player of the Year Statistics

Caledonian League Team

Scottish Amateur Team

Greater Glasgow Team

Club officials

East Kilbride YM 
 Honorary President: Angus McConnell JP
 Chairman: Alan Cunningham
 Club Secretary/Treasurer: Graeme Robertson
 Committee Members: Les Goodfellow, Andy Dykes, Graeme Robertson JNR, Scott Cairns

Caledonian League team
 Manager: Graeme Robertson
 Head Coach: Scott Chaplain
 Assistant Manager: Billy Hamilton
 Goalkeeper Coach: David Lindsay
 Captain: Liam Sloan

Greater Glasgow Premier League team
 Manager: Graeme Robertson JNR
 Assistant Manager: Declan Harley

Players

Goalkeepers

Defenders

Jordan Calder
Liam Sloan

Midfielders

Forwards

Honours 

Caledonian League Presidents Cup
 2014–15, 2018–19
Queens Park Challenge Trophy 
 1997–98 
Caledonian League Division 1A Winners
 2018-19
Caledonian league 2nd Division 
 1995–96
Scottish Amateur Premier League Cup 
 1995
Scottish Amateur 2nd Division 
 1968, 1976, 2003, 2011 
Scottish Amateur 3rd Division
 1973 
Scottish Amateur Coronation Cup 
 1961, 2015/16
Scottish Amateur Reserve Division One
 1953, 1976, 1977, 1979, 1980 
Hall Cup 
 1978, 2011, 2017
Ball Trophy
 1952, 1974, 1978 
Scottish YMCA Cup 
 1967

External links
 Official Club Website

References

Football clubs in Scotland
Football in South Lanarkshire
East Kilbride
1936 establishments in Scotland
Association football clubs established in 1936
Amateur association football teams